Dual-specificity mitogen-activated protein kinase kinase 4 is an enzyme that in humans is encoded by the MAP2K4 gene.

MAP2K4 encodes a dual-specificity kinase that belongs to the Ser/Thr protein kinase family. MAP2K4 phosphorylates MAP kinases in response to various environmental stresses or mitogenic stimuli. MAPK8/JNK1, MAPK9/JNK2, and MAPK14/p38 are substrates for MAP2K4, but MAPK1/ERK2 and MAPK3/ERK1 are not phosphorylated by MAP2K4. Structurally, MAP2K4 contains a kinase domain that is phosphorylated and activated by MAP3K1(aka MEKK1).  MAP2K4 contains multiple amino acid sites that are phosphorylated and ubiquitinated. Genetic studies using Map2k4 knockout mice revealed  embryonic lethality, impaired hepatogenesis and defective liver formation.  Analysis of chimeric mice identified a role for Map2k4 in T cell cytokine production and proliferation.  Map2k4-deficient chimeric mice frequently develop lymphadenopathy.  MAP2K4 is altered in 1.97% of all human cancers.

Interactions 

MAP2K4 has been shown to interact with: 
 MAP3K1, 
 FLNC, 
 MAPK8, 
 MAPK8IP3 and 
AKT1.
ITCH.

References

Further reading 

 

Mitogen-activated Protein Kinases
EC 2.7.11